or  is a river in Troms og Finnmark county, Norway. The river is one of the most important rivers that drains the Finnmarksvidda plateau. It flows into the famous salmon-fishing Tana River near the Finnish village of Karigasniemi on the Norway-Finland border.

The river begins at the small Norwegian lake of Nuorttit Rávdojávri which lies inside the Øvre Anárjohka National Park, just inside the border with Finland. The river begins high on the Finnmarksvidda plateau and then flows north through Kautokeino and Karasjok municipalities. At its confluence with the river Anarjohka, the two rivers form the Tana River. The European route E06 highway runs along the northern shore of the last  of the river.

Media gallery

References

Rivers of Troms og Finnmark
Tana River basin (Norway)
Karasjok
Kautokeino
Rivers of Norway